Kevin Morrice Stewart (born 3 June 1968) is a Scottish National Party (SNP) politician serving as Minister for Mental Wellbeing and Social Care since 2021 and as the Member of the Scottish Parliament (MSP) for Aberdeen Central since 2011. He previously served as Minister for Local Government, Housing and Planning from 2016 to 2021.

Political career
Stewart was a local councillor in Aberdeen between 1999 and 2011, serving as Depute Leader of Aberdeen City Council from 2007. As a councillor, he chaired the Finance and Resources Committee and the North East of Scotland's Regional Transport Partnership, NESTRANS. He also served as the chair of the 3Rs Board.

In the 2011 Scottish Parliament election he was elected to represent Aberdeen Central.

Stewart was the convener of the Scottish Parliament's Local Government and Regeneration Committee, where he oversaw scrutiny of the Community Empowerment (Scotland) Act 2015. Stewart was also a member of the Welfare Reform Committee and also sat on the Justice Sub-committee on Policing. He was also involved in the Cross-Party Groups on Oil & Gas, Scots language, Nuclear Disarmament, Malawi and Tibet. He also acted as Parliamentary Liaison Officer to Nicola Sturgeon from November 2014 until the dissolution of parliament in March 2016.

Stewart has lodged a number of motions in parliament in support of Votes at 16.

He made a speech in favour of same-sex marriage on 20 November 2013 at the Scottish Parliament Stage 1 Debate on the Marriage and Civil Partnership (Scotland) Bill, in which he spoke about his experience of coming out as gay.

Stewart stood again in 2016 and was re-elected with an increased majority. He was appointed as Minister for Local Government and Housing on 18 May 2016 when Sturgeon announced her government.

References

External links 

 
profile at the SNP website
They Work For You.com

1968 births
Living people
Members of the Scottish Parliament for Aberdeen constituencies
Scottish National Party MSPs
Members of the Scottish Parliament 2011–2016
Members of the Scottish Parliament 2016–2021
Members of the Scottish Parliament 2021–2026
Ministers of the Scottish Government
Gay politicians
Councillors in Aberdeen
Scottish National Party councillors
LGBT members of the Scottish Parliament